Leviathan is a 2009 novel written by Scott Westerfeld and illustrated by Keith Thompson. It is the first work in the trilogy of the same name, followed by sequels Behemoth and Goliath. The trilogy is set in an alternative version of World War I in which the Central Powers (known in-universe as "Clankers") use mechanized war machines and the Triple Entente (referred in text as "Darwinists") fabricate living creatures genetically for use in battle. Leviathan was named the Best Young Adult Novel by the Aurealis Award in 2009, Locus in 2010, and Mir Fantastiki in 2011.

Plot
It is the cusp of World War I, and all the European powers are arming up. The Austro-Hungarians and Germans have their Clankers, diesel-driven iron machines loaded with guns and ammunition. The British Darwinists employ fabricated animals as their weaponry. Their Leviathan is a whale airship, and the most masterful beast in the British fleet.

Aleksandar Ferdinand, prince of the Austro-Hungarian Empire, is on the run. His own people have turned on him. His title is worthless. All he has is a battle-torn Stormwalker and a loyal crew of men.

Meanwhile, Deryn, a commoner girl, is staying with her brother Jaspert in London. Her father died in a ballooning accident and her mother and aunts want her to grow up as a proper lady. Deryn dreams of joining the Royal Naval Air Service and to serve on one of the great air beasts. In order to do so, she must pose as a boy ("Dylan Sharp"). To pass the starting exam, she goes aloft with a Huxley (a jellyfish-like creature which uses hydrogen to float) to prove her air-worthiness. However, a storm hits while she is aloft, severely tossing Deryn and the Huxley about, and they narrowly survive—she is forced to cut the Huxley loose from its mooring in order to avoid crashing into a nearby building. This results in Deryn and the Huxley being blown out over the North Sea; she is thrilled when she and the Huxley are rescued by the Leviathan, the most famous of the air-beasts, a massive ecosystem comprising many different animals but based largely on a whale. She is inducted into the crew of the Leviathan, and makes friends with the 'Monkey Luddite' Newkirk. The Leviathan's mission is to transport a top British boffin, or scientist, and a secret package to Constantinople. Deryn is surprised to learn the boffin is a woman, Dr. Nora Barlow, and is afraid Barlow will discover her secret.

In the air over Europe, the Leviathan comes under attack from German airplanes. The crew fights back and defeats the planes, but not before the great whale's hydrogen bladder is severely punctured. The airship crash-lands in Switzerland on the very glacier where Alek's group is hiding. Alek and Volger witness the crash, but Volger insists they do nothing to interfere, as they will risk giving away their position to the Germans or being captured by the British.

Alek is unable to stomach letting the crew of the Leviathan suffer out on the ice, and secretly leaves the fortress to bring medicine to the crew of the fallen ship. The first person he finds is an unconscious Deryn, who had fallen from the rigging during the crash. Alek revives her and claims unconvincingly to be a Swiss villager. Deryn is suspicious of him and sounds the alarm, resulting in Alek's capture. Alek continues to insist he is just a bystander trying to help, but the captain refuses to release him and instead leaves him under Deryn's charge. The secret cargo brought by Dr. Barlow is revealed to be eggs of some kind, though most were destroyed in the crash.

Alek's "family" comes to his rescue, and battle almost erupts between the two sides, but  Deryn's quick thinking in bringing Alek to the front and holding him as a hostage brings everyone together to talk under a flag of truce. Realizing their differences are outweighed by their similarities, Alek offers a sizable chunk from their food storage so the ship can replenish its hydrogen supply and take off again. However, as they travel back to the Leviathan, two German zeppelins appear and send out commandos to capture them. Unfortunately, one of the zeppelins escapes, and the Stormwalker is severely damaged by an aerial bomb, making it impossible to stand up and repair.

Thanks to the diplomacy of Dr. Barlow and a bright idea from Alek, the two groups decide to combine their technologies and leave together as one group. Alek also admits his true origins to Deryn/Dylan and Dr. Barlow when he realizes he let a few too many things slip. The Austrians dismantle the Stormwalker and use its engines to replace those lost by the Leviathan. The Austrian engines prove to be much more powerful than its previous ones, propelling them quickly away from danger and Herkules, a deadly Clanker ship.

In the aftermath, Dr. Barlow reveals information about a fabricated ship in England that was sold to the Ottoman Empire but then taken back by Winston Churchill despite being paid in full, thus creating tension between the British and the Ottomans. The novel closes with the Leviathan continuing its flight towards Constantinople with Alek watching the mysterious eggs that will hatch into some unknown fabricated species.

Development
The idea of incorporating illustrations into the Leviathan Trilogy began back in 2007 when author Westerfeld discovered illustrations for the Japanese translation of his earlier work Uglies, to which he had shared them on his blog. He was met with feedback from English-speaking fans who complained of how their novels were lacking in such features; until one reader pointed out how they are a norm in Japanese novels, particularly light novels. Further research by Westerfeld also found it to be a commonality in old Western novels prior to the invention of the camera. Inspiration also came from adventure novels that were around during the World War I era, which became one basis of research for the series' settings.

Reception
Leviathan received a starred review from Kirkus Reviews, and was compared to works by Hayao Miyazaki, Kenneth Oppel and Naomi Novik, but promised that the novel could "stand—or fly—on its own."  It also gained a starred review from School Library Journal, who said it was "Full of nonstop action" and that "This steampunk adventure is sure to become a classic."  The ALSC selected it as a 2010 Notable Children's Book and the YALSA listed it on their 2010 Best Books for Young Adults.  In addition, Leviathan won the 2009 Aurealis Award for Best Young Adult Novel.

References

External links 

Fiction set in 1914
2009 American novels
American alternate history novels
American young adult novels
Aurealis Award-winning works
Children's science fiction novels
Novels by Scott Westerfeld
Steampunk novels
World War I alternate histories
Novels set during World War I
Biopunk novels
Novels set in Istanbul